Jessica Kathryn Brungo (born April 16, 1982) is an American women's basketball player formerly with the Connecticut Sun of the Women's National Basketball Association (WNBA). She was selected 16th overall in the 2004 WNBA Draft out of Penn State. During her career at Penn State, she scored 1,143 points, and grabbed 649 rebounds. She played for basketball hall of famer Rene Portland.

She is a graduate of North Allegheny High School in Wexford, Pennsylvania.

Penn State statistics
Source

WNBA career
2004–2006: Connecticut Sun

References

External links
Player profile

1982 births
Living people
People from Oyster Bay (town), New York
American women's basketball players
Basketball players from Pennsylvania
Connecticut Sun draft picks
Connecticut Sun players
Penn State Lady Lions basketball players
People from Allegheny County, Pennsylvania
Small forwards